Chaetodiadema japonicum is a species of sea urchins of the Family Diadematidae. Their armor is covered with spines. Chaetodiadema japonicum was first scientifically described in 1904 by Ole Theodor Jensen Mortensen.

See also 
 Chaetodiadema africanum
 Chaetodiadema granulatum
 Chaetodiadema keiense

References 

Animals described in 1904
Diadematidae
Taxa named by Ole Theodor Jensen Mortensen